Leiostyla monticola is a species of land snail in the family Lauriidae. It is endemic to Porto Santo Island in the Madeira archipelago.

This snail occurs at a few sites on the main mountain peaks of the island. It lives in leaf litter on rocky slopes and in abandoned conifer plantations. The population is likely stable, but potential threats include recreational activities on the mountains.

References

Endemic fauna of Madeira
Molluscs of Madeira
Leiostyla
Gastropods described in 1831
Taxonomy articles created by Polbot